The Buenos Aires Underground (locally known as subte, from "subterráneo") is a mass-transit network that serves the city of Buenos Aires, Argentina.

Lines

Stations 
There are 87 underground stations and 18 premetro stations.

Stations under construction

Ghost stations

See also
Buenos Aires Underground
List of metro systems

External links

 Metrovías official website
 Subterráneos de Buenos Aires

 
Stations
Buenos Aires